Amy Montenegro (born November 1, 1983) is an American mixed martial artist. She competes in the strawweight division for Invicta FC.

Mixed Martial Arts

The Ultimate Fighter
In April 2016, it was announced that Montenegro would be a contestant on The Ultimate Fighter: Team Joanna vs. Team Cláudia. She was defeated by Helen Harper in the opening qualifying round.

Mixed martial arts record

|-
| Loss
| align=center| 8–4
| Miranda Granger
| Submission (guillotine choke)
| Dominate FC 2
| 
| align=center|1
| align=center|2:45
| Tacoma, Washington
|For the Dominate FC Strawweight Championship.
|-
| Loss
| align=center| 8–3
| Virna Jandiroba
| Submission (armbar)
| Invicta FC 26: Maia vs. Niedzwiedz
| 
| align=center|1
| align=center|2:50
| Kansas City, Missouri
|
|-
| Win
| align=center| 8–2
| Celine Haga
| Decision (unanimous)
| Invicta FC 21: Anderson vs. Tweet
| 
| align=center|3
| align=center|5:00
| Kansas City, Missouri
|
|-
| Win
| align=center| 7–2
| Glena Avila
| Decision (unanimous)
| Super Fight League 45
| 
| align=center|5
| align=center|5:00
| Tacoma, Washington
|
|-
| Loss
| align=center| 6–2
| Jamie Moyle
| Decision (split)
| Invicta FC 13: Cyborg vs. Van Duin
| 
| align=center|3
| align=center|5:00
| Las Vegas, Nevada
|
|-
| Win
| align=center| 6–1
| Brianna van Buren
| Decision (unanimous)
| Invicta FC 11: Cyborg vs. Tweet
| 
| align=center|3
| align=center|5:00
| Los Angeles, California
|
|-
| Win
| align=center| 5–1
| Diana Rael
| TKO (punches)
| KOTC: Tactical Strike
| 
| align=center|2
| align=center|2:54
| Worley, Idaho
|
|-
| Win
| align=center| 4–1
| Kathina Catron
| Submission (rear-naked choke)
| Xtreme Fighting Inc. 12
| 
| align=center|3
| align=center|2:22
| Fort Smith, Arkansas
|
|-
| Loss
| align=center| 3–1
| Katie Howard
| Decision (split)
| CageSport 31
| 
| align=center|3
| align=center|5:00
| Tacoma, Washington
|
|-
| Win
| align=center| 3–0
| Jessica Doerner
| Submission (rear-naked choke)
| CageSport 28
| 
| align=center|1
| align=center|4:51
| Tacoma, Washington
|
|-
| Win
| align=center| 2–0
| Hadley Griffith
| Submission (rear-naked choke)
| CageSport 27
| 
| align=center|3
| align=center|3:21
| Tacoma, Washington
|
|-
| Win
| align=center| 1–0
| Cheryl Chan
| Decision (split)
| Cage Warrior Combat 4
| 
| align=center|3
| align=center|5:00
| Kingston, Washington
|
|-

References

1983 births
People from Issaquah, Washington
American female mixed martial artists
Strawweight mixed martial artists
Living people
Mixed martial artists from Washington (state)
21st-century American women